South Carolina Highway 188 (SC 188) is a  state highway in the U.S. state of South Carolina. The highway travels through rural areas of Oconee County. It is known as Keowee School Road for its entire length.

Route description
SC 188 begins at an intersection with SC 28 (Blue Ridge Boulevard) northwest of Seneca, within Oconee County, where the roadway continues as Bountyland Road. It travels to the north-northwest and then curves to the northeast just before passing Oconee Christian Academy. It crosses over Cane Creek on the McMahan Bridge. Just south of White Harbor, it crosses over part of Lake Keowee on an unnamed bridge. North of White Harbor, it passes Keowee Elementary School. East-northeast of Walhalla, the highway meets its northern terminus, an intersection with SC 183.

Major intersections

See also

References

External links

SC 188 at Virginia Highways' South Carolina Highways Annex
Former SC 188 ALT at Virginia Highways' South Carolina Highways Annex

188
Transportation in Oconee County, South Carolina